Venus Williams was the defending champion, but did not compete this year due to a tendinitis in her left wrist.

Monica Seles won the title by defeating Nathalie Dechy 6–1, 7–6(7–3) in the final.

Seeds
The top two seeds received a bye to the second round.

Draw

Finals

Top half

Bottom half

References
 Official results archive (ITF)
 Official results archive (WTA)

2000 WTA Tour